Laurent Tuel (born 1966) is a French film actor, director and writer.

Career
Laurent Tuel released his first short film "Céleste" in 1989, when he was 23. In 2007 he was nominated for César Awards for his Jean-Philippe film. He is the author of Le Premier Cercle (2009) film.

Filmography

External links
 Tuel
 Filmography

References

French film directors
French male film actors
1966 births
Living people